The 1965-66 season was Chelsea Football Club's 52nd of competitive football, and their 39th in the English top flight.

Results

First Division

FA Cup

Fairs Cup

Notes

References
Soccerbase
Hockings, Ron. 100 Years of the Blues: A Statistical History of Chelsea Football Club. (2007)

Chelsea F.C. seasons
Chelsea